Youssef El-Kamash (born 20 July 1995) is an Egyptian swimmer. He competed in the men's 50 metre breaststroke event at the 2017 World Aquatics Championships. In 2019, he represented Egypt at the 2019 African Games held in Rabat, Morocco.

References

1995 births
Living people
Egyptian male swimmers
Place of birth missing (living people)
Swimmers at the 2018 Mediterranean Games
African Games silver medalists for Egypt
African Games medalists in swimming
Male breaststroke swimmers
Mediterranean Games competitors for Egypt
Swimmers at the 2015 African Games
Swimmers at the 2019 African Games